Craig Northey (born February 9, 1962) is a Canadian musician and film and TV composer. He is one of the founding members of the band Odds, which released four albums between 1991 and 1996. They were best known for the radio singles "It Falls Apart", "Eat My Brain", "Heterosexual Man" and "Someone Who's Cool".

Career
Like many musicians, Northey praises the Tragically Hip's generosity to up-and-coming bands, specifically the Odds: "Last year, they paid for us to come down to Seattle to see them play and then play ourselves...then, they invited us to play with them on Canada Day at Molson Park in Barrie. It really paid off for us." In 1996, Northey composed his first score for a feature film, The Kids in the Hall's Brain Candy.

After the breakup of Odds in 1999, Northey embarked on several other ventures, including working with Colin James, Rosanne Cash, Glen Phillips, Bruce McCulloch and many others. He released a solo CD entitled Giddy Up. In 2003 he collaborated on a CD with Jesse Valenzuela of Gin Blossoms, under the band name Northey Valenzuela.

In 2004 he was part of a side project, Stripper's Union, with Rob Baker, Doug Elliott, Simon Kendall and Pat Steward.  The group produced an album,  Stripper's Union Local 518, which was released in 2005.

With Valenzuela he co-wrote the theme "Not a Lot Goin' On" for the hit TV comedy series Corner Gas. The song was later included on the Northey Valenzuela album.

When the Odds reunited in early 2007 they included the end credit theme from Corner Gas "My Happy Place" on their album Cheerleader.

Currently Northey, along with Murray Atkinson, Doug Elliott and Pat Steward comprise the reunited Odds. Concurrently he has composed all the episodes for the Kids in the Hall's CBC/IFC series Death Comes to Town and CTV's Hiccups.

Northey continues to collaborate with other artists. He co-wrote songs on ex-Barenaked Ladies singer Steven Page's first solo album Page One and toured with Page in 2012. His collaboration with Rob Baker in Strippers Union yielded another album The Deuce in 2012.

In February 2014 Odds released an EP called The Most Beautiful Place on Earth.

After performing a show in Niagara in July, 2016, Northey toured Canada in 2017 as part of The Trans-Canada Highwaymen with Page, Moe Berg of The Pursuit of Happiness and Chris Murphy of Sloan. In 2018, he composed and performed music for the web series This Blows, created by his children Cole and Aleita Northey.

Associated acts
Odds
Stripper's Union
Gin Blossoms
Colin James
Brent Butt
The Kids in the Hall
Rosanne Cash

Discography

With Odds
1991: Neopolitan 
1993: Bedbugs 
1995: Good Weird Feeling
1996: Nest
2009: Cheerleader
2013: the Most Beautiful Place on Earth

Solo
2002:  Giddy Up

Collaborations
1999: Sharkskin: Sharkskin
2003: Northey Valenzuela: Northey Valenzuela
2005: Stripper's Union: Stripper's Union Local 518
2011: Stripper's Union: The Deuce

Writer
1997: Waltons: Empire Hotel
2000: Colin James: Fuse
2000: Paul Hyde: Living off the Radar
2000: Damhnait Doyle: Hyperdramatic
2000: Wide Mouth Mason: Stew
2001: Glen Phillips: Abulum
2001: Bruce McCulloch: Drunk Baby Project
2001: Waltons: Liv
2002: Jesse Valenzuela: Tunes Young People Will Enjoy
2003: Wide Mouth Mason: Rained Out Parade
2003: Colin James: Traveler
2003: Rosanne Cash: Rules of Travel
2003: Glen Phillips: Live at Largo
2004: David Gogo: Vibe
2004: Damhnait Doyle: Davnet
2004: Lulu: Back on Track
2005: Colin James: Limelight
2006: Colin James: Colin James & The Little Big Band 3
2006: Tom Wilson: Dog Years
2006: Rex Goudie: Under the Lights
2007: Liam Titcomb: Can't Let Go
2007: Jimmy Rankin: Edge of Day
2007: Adam Levy: Washing Day
2009: Jason Plumb & the Willing: Wide Open Music
2009: Colin James: Rooftops and Satellites
2010: Swan: Salt March
2011: Gin Blossoms: No Chocolate Cake
2011: Steven Page: Page One 
2012: Steven Page: A Different Sort of Solitude

Film and television composer
1995: The Kids in the Hall in Brain Candy, Paramount Pictures
1996: Dog Park, Lions Gate Pictures
2002: The Kids in the Hall, Tour of Duty DVD
2004-2009: Corner Gas, CTV, theme music 
2006: Kraft Hockeyville, CBC Television 7 episodes 
2010: Kids in the Hall in "Death Comes to Town", CBC Television, 8 episodes 
2010: The Brent Butt Comedy Special, The Comedy Network
2010-2011: Hiccups, CTV, 26 episodes
2011: Geofreakz, Teletoon, 20 episodes

Personal 
Northey is the father of actress Aleita Northey, star of the CBC series This Blows.

See also
Canadian Rock
Canadian blues
Music of Canada

References

External links
 Craig Northey official website
 
 
 Craig Northey from Canada plays Hagstrom

1962 births
Living people
Canadian male singers
Canadian rock singers
Canadian alternative rock musicians
Alternative rock singers